Dalešice Hydro Power Plant on the Jihlava River is a large power plant in the Czech Republic that has four Francis turbines with a nominal capacity of  each and a total capacity of . The old turbines before the 1999–2007 reconstruction had a capacity of  each.  The plant includes the lower Dalešice-Mohelno Dam.

Dalešice Dam
It was built between 1970 and 1978 together with the Mohelno Dam as a water source for the nearby Dukovany Nuclear Power Station. As it has the fastest-starting turbines of all dams in Czech republic (less than 1 minute to full power) it also acts as emergency source in case some of the reactors in Dukovany shut down (for that reason it was also initially equipped with total capacity of 450 MW to back-up one of the four 440MWe VVER440 reactors). Thanks to the turbine capability to act as pumps it also plays significant balancing role for distributing network when it pumps water back to the higher reservoir during the night, and uses it again to produce electricity during the daily consumption peaks.

Mohelno Dam

The Mohelno Dam is through-flow dam, acting as the lower reservoir of the Dalešice-Mohelno pump-dam complex. It includes single Kaplan turbine (1.2 MW) and single Francis turbine (0.6 MW). In case of total blackout, the Mohelno turbines can jumpstart the Dalešice Francis turbines and together start the Dukovany NPP. Thanks to this the whole Dalešice-Dukovany complex is certified for fully autonomous operation independent of the external distribution network.

References

External links 

 Official webpage

Energy infrastructure completed in 1978
Pumped-storage hydroelectric power stations in the Czech Republic
Třebíč District
Hydroelectric power stations in the Czech Republic